The 2013 Coral Masters was the inaugural staging of the non-ranking darts tournament The Masters, held by the Professional Darts Corporation (PDC). It was held between 1–3 November 2013 at the Royal Highland Centre in Edinburgh, Scotland.

Phil Taylor won the title by beating Adrian Lewis 10–1 in the final.

Qualifiers
Only the top 16 players on the PDC's Order of Merit on 20 October 2013 qualified for the event. These were:

  Phil Taylor (winner)
  Michael van Gerwen (quarter-finals)
  Adrian Lewis (runner-up)
  Simon Whitlock (quarter-finals)
  James Wade (semi-finals)
  Andy Hamilton (first round)
  Dave Chisnall (first round)
  Wes Newton (quarter-finals)
  Justin Pipe (first round)
  Raymond van Barneveld (semi-finals)
  Robert Thornton (quarter-finals)
  Kevin Painter (first round)
  Mervyn King (first round)
  Kim Huybrechts (first round)
  Peter Wright (first round)
  Terry Jenkins (first round)

Prize money
The total prize fund was £160,000.

Draw

Statistics
{|class="wikitable sortable" style="font-size: 95%; text-align: right"
|-
! Player
! Eliminated
! Played
! Legs Won
! Legs Lost
! LWAT
! 100+
! 140+
! 180s
! High checkout
! 3-dart average
|-
|align="left"|  Phil Taylor
| Winner
| 4
| 34
| 7
| 15
| 55
| 37
| 11
| 143
| 105.38
|-
|align="left"|  Adrian Lewis
| Runner-up
| 4
| 25
| 26
| 6
| 61
| 42
| 16
| 156
| 101.82
|-
|align="left"|  Raymond van Barneveld
| Semi-finals
| 3
| 23
| 19
| 6
| 46
| 37
| 13
| 143
| 98.11
|-
|align="left"|  James Wade
| Semi-finals
| 3
| 15
| 22
| 4
| 41
| 21
| 5
| 91
| 86.34
|-
|align="left"|  Michael van Gerwen
| Quarter-finals
| 2
| 12
| 10
| 5
| 29
| 12
| 5
| 135
| 98.87
|-
|align="left"|  Simon Whitlock
| Quarter-finals
| 2
| 13
| 12
| 4
| 28
| 18
| 8
| 112
| 95.21
|-
|align="left"|  Wes Newton
| Quarter-finals
| 2
| 8
| 13
| 4
| 22
| 17
| 5
| 65
| 95.20
|-
|align="left"|  Robert Thornton
| Quarter-finals
| 2
| 8
| 12
| 3
| 30
| 10
| 5
| 70
| 94.39
|-
|align="left"|  Kim Huybrechts
| First round
| 1
| 5
| 6
| 0
| 16
| 9
| 3
| 100
| 106.43
|-
|align="left"|  Peter Wright
| First round
| 1
| 2
| 6
| 1
| 11
| 6
| 3
| 125
| 99.92
|-
|align="left"|  Dave Chisnall
| First round
| 1
| 3
| 6
| 1
| 12
| 5
| 2
| 84
| 94.06
|-
|align="left"|  Mervyn King
| First round
| 1
| 4
| 6
| 1
| 12
| 7
| 1
| 121
| 93.50
|-
|align="left"|  Kevin Painter
| First round
| 1
| 5
| 6
| 1
| 26
| 6
| 1
| 79
| 92.93
|-
|align="left"|  Andy Hamilton
| First round
| 1
| 4
| 6
| 1
| 7
| 5
| 5
| 61
| 89.24
|-
|align="left"|  Justin Pipe
| First round
| 1
| 5
| 6
| 3
| 11
| 11
| 1
| 88
| 88.26
|-
|align="left"|  Terry Jenkins
| First round
| 1
| 3
| 6
| 1
| 16
| 5
| 0
| 120
| 86.89
|-

Broadcasting
The tournament was available on ITV4 in the United Kingdom. It was also shown on RTL 7 in the Netherlands, Sport1 in Germany, Fox Sports in Australia and on Sky New Zealand.

References

Masters
Masters (darts)
Masters (darts)
Masters (darts)
International sports competitions in Edinburgh
2010s in Edinburgh